Terellia oriunda is a species of tephritid or fruit flies in the genus Terellia of the family Tephritidae.

Distribution
China.

References

Tephritinae
Insects described in 1941
Diptera of Asia